Elenita "Ellen" Sombillo Binay, M.D. (born Elenita Gabriel Sombillo; November 9, 1943) is a Filipina politician and physician. She served as mayor of Makati from 1998 to 2001. She is the wife of former Vice President Jejomar Binay. They have several children, some of whom are casting their lots into the political ring. She is the mother of former Makati Mayor Jejomar "Junjun" Binay, Jr., incumbent Makati Mayor Abigail Binay, and Senator Nancy Binay.

Early life and education
Elenita Gabriel Sombillo was born on November 9, 1943, in Angat, Bulacan to Faustino Sombillo, a former vice mayor of the said town, and Loreto Gabriel. His father also owned a construction company, while her mother had an embroidery export business. Having been orphaned early, she worked at odd jobs like taking care of a relative's poultry, going to the market, and learning to type papers as she was determined to complete her studies. She took up medicine at Manila Central University. She then worked as a resident physician and OB-GYN at José R. Reyes Memorial Medical Center. There, she would meet her would-be husband, human rights lawyer Jejomar Binay, who represented the DT Law Office in the hospital's court case. They later got married on July 1972, just before the declaration of Martial Law.

Political career
Elenita Binay, though employed as a medical practitioner, ran and won as Mayor of Makati after her husband vacated the post. She became the first female Mayor of Makati, serving from 1998 to 2001.

Binay's (and private businessmen Li Yee Shing, Jason Li and Vivian M. Edurise, and Ernesto Aspillaga's) arraignment for graft charges was set by the Sandiganbayan's 4th Division on January 18, 2008.

References

Living people
1943 births
Mayors of Makati
Filipino women medical doctors
Women mayors of places in the Philippines
PDP–Laban politicians
Elenita
People from Makati
20th-century Filipino medical doctors
21st-century Filipino medical doctors
20th-century women physicians
21st-century women physicians
Filipino Roman Catholics